The 2016–17 Michigan State Spartans women's basketball team represented Michigan State University during the 2016–17 NCAA Division I women's basketball season. The Spartans, led by tenth-year head coach Suzy Merchant, played their home games at the Breslin Center in East Lansing, Michigan and were members of the Big Ten Conference. They finished the season 21–12, 9–7 in Big Ten play to finish in a tie for sixth place. In the Big Ten tournament, they beat Wisconsin and Michigan before losing in the semifinals to Maryland. They received an at-large bid to the NCAA tournament as a No. 8 seed where the lost in the First Round to Arizona State. Head Coach Suzy Merchant took a medical leave of absence of January 17, 2017 after fainting on the sidelines during a game against Illinois. She also missed the following game against Purdue days after fainting.

Previous season 
The Spartans finished the 2015–16 season 25–9, 13–5 in Big Ten play to finish in third place. They defeated Purdue and Ohio State in the Big Ten tournament before losing in the championship game to Maryland. They received an at-large bid to the NCAA tournament as a No. 4 seed. They defeated Belmont in the First Round before losing to Mississippi State in the Second Round.

Roster

Schedule and results

|-
!colspan=9 style=| Exhibition

|-
!colspan=9 style=| Non-conference regular season

|-
!colspan=9 style=| Big Ten regular season

|-
!colspan=9 style=|Big Ten tournament

|-
!colspan=9 style=|NCAA tournament

Rankings

See also
2016–17 Michigan State Spartans men's basketball team

References

Michigan State Spartans women's basketball seasons
Michigan State
Michigan State